Janis Kristin Klecker (née Horns) (born July 18, 1960 in Bloomington, Minnesota) is a former American long-distance runner who is a two-time United States national champion in the marathon.

Biography
Klecker was in the Alpha Phi sorority at the University of Minnesota.

Her husband, Barney Klecker is a two-time champion of the City of Lakes/Twin Cities Marathon.

Janis is the mother of six children, including Joe Klecker, who is a professional runner 

As of 2009, Klecker is a dentist in Minnesota

Racing career
Klecker won the 1992 US Olympic Trials marathon in Houston and went on to compete in the marathon at the 1992 Summer Olympics in Barcelona, an event in which she placed 21st. Klecker has won the City of Lakes Marathon/Twin Cities Marathon three times (1980, 1991, 1992), the San Francisco Marathon twice (1983, 1990), and the California International Marathon twice (1988, 1990).

Janis Klecker is an American record holders in the 50 K in 1983.

Klecker finished second to Nancy Ditz in the 1985 California International Marathon, but went on to win the event in 1988 and 1990. She set a course record at the 1990 CIM with a time of 2:30:42.

On Sept. 22, 1991, in Syracuse, New York, Klecker became the woman's U.S. National Champion in the 5K.

Klecker's PR in the marathon was 2:30:12 in Houston, Texas on January 26, 1992.

Achievements

References

External links
 

1960 births
Living people
American female long-distance runners
American female marathon runners
Athletes (track and field) at the 1992 Summer Olympics
Olympic track and field athletes of the United States
21st-century American women